Tommaso Caracciolo (1572–1631), was a Count of Roccarainola and a Field Marshal who commanded parts of the Spanish forces in the Thirty Years' War.

Tommaso Caracciolo may also refer to:

Tommaso Caracciolo (archbishop) (died 1665), Italian Archbishop of Taranto (1636–1637)
Tommaso Caracciolo (archbishop of Capua), Italian Archbishop of Capua (1502–1540)
Tommaso Caracciolo (bishop of Gerace) (1640–1689), Italian Bishop of Gerace (1687–1689)